Sir Alexander Robertson  (14 November 1896 – 27 August 1970) was a British police officer. He served as Deputy Commissioner of Police of the Metropolis from 1958 to 1961.

Robertson won the Distinguished Conduct Medal (DCM) in 1916 for gallantry while serving in the Scots Guards. He was promoted from deputy commander to commander in the Metropolitan Police in 1952 and transferred to "A" Department. He was appointed Assistant Commissioner "A", in charge of administration and uniformed policing, on 2 January 1957. He remained in the job until his promotion to Deputy Commissioner on 1 September 1958. He retired on 1 November 1961, having been knighted in the 1961 New Year Honours.

Footnotes

1970 deaths
Knights Bachelor
Assistant Commissioners of Police of the Metropolis
Deputy Commissioners of Police of the Metropolis
Recipients of the Distinguished Conduct Medal
British Army personnel of World War I
1896 births
Scots Guards soldiers
Officers of the Order of St John
English recipients of the Queen's Police Medal
Metropolitan Police recipients of the Queen's Police Medal